is a Japanese footballer who plays for J2 League club FC Ryukyu, as a second striker or midfielder.

Club statistics
Updated to end of 2018 season.

References

External links 
 Profile at Renofa Yamaguchi FC 
 
 

1988 births
Living people
People from Ichihara, Chiba
Association football people from Chiba Prefecture
Japanese footballers
J2 League players
J3 League players
Japan Football League players
Sagawa Shiga FC players
FC Ryukyu players
Renofa Yamaguchi FC players
Association football midfielders